No. 6 (Violet, Green and Red) is a painting by the Latvian-American abstract expressionist artist Mark Rothko. It was painted in 1951.
In common with Rothko's other works from this period, No. 6 consists of large expanses of colour delineated by uneven, hazy shades. In 2014, it became one of the most expensive paintings sold at auction.

2014 sale
No.6 (Violet, Green and Red) is one of the works implicated in the infamous Bouvier Affair. It was privately bought for €140 million by Dmitry Rybolovlev  in 2014. Rybolovlev is thought to have bought the painting via the Swiss dealer, Bouvier. Rybolovlev learnt that Bouvier had actually bought the painting (rather than simply acting as a dealer) from Paiker H.B. for ~€80,000,000 before selling it on to Rybolovlev for €140,000,000.

See also
 List of most expensive paintings

Notes

Sources
Baal-Teshuva, Jacob. Rothko. Berlin: Taschen, 2003. 

1951 paintings
Paintings by Mark Rothko
Oil on canvas paintings